Behera Sahi is a village located in Jaleswar, Balasore district on the bank of Subarnarekha River. It has a population of 1500 on account of the census 2001.

List of Schools
 Behera Sahi primary school
 Bhaskar ch. M.E. school

Religious Places
Baba Ragadeswar Shiba temple (location middle of the village)

Villages in Balasore district